Jerry Jerome may refer to:
 Jerry Jerome (boxer) (1874–1943), Australian boxer
 Jerry Jerome (saxophonist) (1912–2001), American musician

See also
Jerome Jerome, English writer